Past Life Regression may refer to:

 Past life regression, a technique purporting to recover memories of past lives
 Past Life Regression, a 2015 album by the band Orbs